The Théâtre de la Madeleine is a theater in Paris built in the English style in 1924 on the site of a carousel. The first major success of the theatre came with the presentation of part one of The Merchants of Glory by Marcel Pagnol.

The Théâtre de la Madeleine was closely associated with the French stage actor, film actor, director, screenwriter, and prolific playwright Sacha Guitry who composed 24 of his plays here between 1932 and 1940.

Simone Valere and Jean Desailly were directors of the theater from 1980 until 2002. In 2003 the director's job was taken over by Frederick Frank (until 2012) and Stéphane Lissner (until 2005). Since 2012, Jean-Claude Camus has been director.

References

External links
 
 Program: https://www.lesarchivesduspectacle.net/?IDX_Organisme=256#organisme-programmation

Theatres in Paris
Buildings and structures in the 8th arrondissement of Paris